The EuroBasket 2025 will be the 42nd edition of the EuroBasket championship, the quadrennial international men's basketball championship organized by FIBA Europe.

Like the previous three editions, the tournament will be co-hosted by multiple countries; Latvia, Cyprus, Finland and Poland.

Host selection
FIBA Europe opened three bidding options for hosting: to host a preliminary group, to host the final round or to host the entire tournament. The EuroBasket in 2015, 2017 and 2022, tendered in the same way, each of these tournaments was hosted in four countries.

Six counties submitted separate candidacies to host Eurobasket 2025:

 (Limassol)
 (Helsinki)
 (Budapest)
 (Riga)
 (Perm)
 (Kyiv, Lviv and Dnipro)

During its meeting on 28 March 2022, the FIBA Europe Board selected Latvia, Cyprus and Finland to host the tournament, with Latvia hosting the knockout phase. Ukraine was an option to be the fourth host during the group stage. Due to the Russian invasion of Ukraine, Poland was named the fourth country to play host.

Venues
On 6 March 2023, Tampere was announced as the host city for Finland.

Qualification

The qualification process started in November 2021, with ten teams participating in the pre-qualifiers, including the eight eliminated teams from the 2023 World Cup European Pre-Qualifiers. The co-hosts will participate in the qualifiers, despite automatic qualification to the EuroBasket 2025.

Qualified teams

References

External links

 
2025

2020s in Helsinki
2020s in Riga

Sports competitions in Riga
International basketball competitions hosted by Cyprus
International basketball competitions hosted by Finland
International basketball competitions hosted by Latvia
International basketball competitions hosted by Poland
EuroBasket, 2025
Sport in Limassol
International sports competitions in Helsinki